Ortaköy ( Middle Village) is a neighbourhood within the Beşiktaş district of Istanbul, Turkey, on the European shore of the Bosphorus. it was originally a small fishing village, known in Greek as Agios Fokas (Άγιος Φωκάς) in the Byzantine period and then as Mesachorion (Μεσαχώριον, meaning 'Middle Village').

During the Ottoman era and into the first decades of the Turkish Republic, Ortaköy was a cosmopolitan place with communities of Turks, Greeks, Armenians and Jews. Today although the neighbourhood still retains a Jewish synagogue and Greek Orthodox church, it is almost entirely Turkish and Muslim. It is a popular tourist area, with small art galleries, expensive nightclubs, cafés, bars, and restaurants.

There are several good educational establishments, such as Kabataş Erkek Lisesi and Galatasaray University, in Ortaköy. 

Ortaköy is not served by any trams or Metro stations. Although many buses run along the coastal road and pass through it, it is a notorious traffic bottleneck, especially at weekends.

History 
Ortaköy had an important role in the daily life of the city during the Byzantine and Ottoman periods. In the 16th century, the Ottoman Sultan Süleyman the Magnificent encouraged Turks to move to Ortaköy, thereby beginning the Turkish presence in what had been a largely Greek neighbourhood. One of the oldest buildings in Ortaköy is the hamam (Turkish bath) that was built by the famous Ottoman architect Mimar Sinan in 1556 (this is no longer in use).

During the 19th century the British writer Emilia Hornby rented a house in Ortaköy and left a vivid description of life there in her Constantinople During the Crimean War, published in 1863.

After the establishment of Israel in 1948, most of the Jewish population emigrated. The riots of 1955 caused many members of Ortaköy's Greek and Armenian communities to leave as well. There are very few non-Muslims left today.

The German architect Bruno Taut lived in a hillside house above Ortaköy that combined Japanese and European architectural styles to reflect his life in exile. 

George W. Bush gave a speech in Ortaköy at the Galatasaray University during the 2004 NATO Summit.

Terrorism 
On 1 January 2017, Ortaköy was the scene of a deadly terrorist attack at the Reina nightclub, where hundreds of people were celebrating the New Year. Thirty-nine people lost their lives. The club was closed down and demolished in May 2017.

Attractions 

Ortaköy Mosque is a particularly beautiful Neo-Baroque structure right beside the Bosphorus and visible from passing boats.The first version of the mosque was built in the 18th century but the current mosque, commissioned by Sultan Abdülmecid I and designed by architects (father and son) Garabet Amira Balyan and Nigoğayos Balyan in Neo-Baroque style, was built between 1854 and 1856.

The mosque is very close to the European pylon of the Bosphorus Bridge (now officially renamed the 15 July Martyrs Bridge), one of the three bridges that connect the European and Asian banks of İstanbul.

The Esma Sultan Mansion (1875) also stands near the Bosphorus Bridge. An Ottoman-era yalı presented to Esma Sultan as a wedding gift by her father Sultan Abdülaziz, it was badly damaged by a fire in 1975. then renovated in the 1990s by The Marmara Hotels group. In 2001 it opened as a multipurpose event venue. The exterior of the burnt historic building was left untouched, creating an interesting contrast with its modern interior.

Çıragan Palace 

In 1871, Sultan Abdülaziz built the Çırağan Palace which stands beside the Bosphorus between Beşiktaş and Ortaköy. The sultan lived in the palace for some time and it was later used as a place of imprisonment for other members of the imperial family. Later the Palace was used to house the Ottoman Parliament until it was badly damaged by a fire in 1910. Repaired and restored in the 1980s, it is now the Çırağan Palace Kempinski Istanbul Hotel, one of Istanbul's most luxurious hotels.

Sports 
The local sports club is Ortaköy Spor Kulübü.

See also 
 Emirgan
 Rumelihisarı

References and notes 

Aksaray
Ortaköy Belediyesi

External links 

Neighbourhoods of Beşiktaş
Bosphorus
Restaurant districts and streets in Turkey
Entertainment districts in Turkey